Oncideres cumdisci is a species of beetle in the family Cerambycidae. It was described by Noguera in 1993. It is known from Honduras and Mexico.

References

cumdisci
Beetles described in 1993